The Second Fleet was a reserve formation of the Royal Navy that briefly existed before the First World War.

History
Formed on 1 May 1912 from the Third Division of the Home Fleet, its ships were manned by a nucleus crew during peacetime, but were intended to be manned by men from the naval schools when mobilised. It reported directly to the Commander-in-Chief, Home Fleets. The fleet was mobilised in late July 1914 as tensions increased between Great Britain and Imperial Germany and remained on active duty until war was declared on 4 August. It reformed the Channel Fleet upon the declaration of war and consisted of the Fifth and Sixth Battle Squadrons, equipped with a total of 15 pre-dreadnought battleships and the majority of the Home Defence Patrol Flotillas.

Commanders

Components
Included

Footnotes

Bibliography

External links

Fleets of the Royal Navy
Military units and formations established in 1912
Military units and formations disestablished in 1914
1912 establishments in the United Kingdom
Military units and formations of the Royal Navy in World War I